The Echegaray Medal (Spanish: La Medalla Echegaray) is the highest scientific award granted by the Spanish Royal Academy of Sciences. The award was created by Alfonso XIII at the request of Santiago Ramón y Cajal after the award of the Nobel Prize to José Echegaray and is awarded in recognition of an exceptional scientific career.

The first time it was granted was in 1907 to the eponymous José Echegaray. More than a hundred years after the award was created, the first woman to receive the Echegaray Medal was Margarita Salas in 2016 during a ceremony which was presided over by Juan Carlos I and Queen Sofía of Spain.

Past recipients 

 1907 José Echegaray
 1910 Eduardo Saavedra
 1913 SAS el Príncipe Alberto I de Mónaco
 1916 Leonardo Torres Quevedo
 1919 Svante Arrhenius
 1922 Santiago Ramón y Cajal
 1925 Hendrik Antoon Lorentz
 1928 Ignacio Bolívar
 1931 Ernest Rutherford
 1934 Joaquín María de Castellarnau
 1968 Obdulio Fernández
 1975 José María Otero de Navascués
 1979 José García Santesmases
 1998 Manuel Lora Tamayo
 2016 Margarita Salas
 2018 Mariano Barbacid
 2020 Francisco Guinea
 2022 José A. Carrillo

References 

Academic awards
Spanish awards
Science and technology in Spain